Bravery in the Field is a 1979 Canadian short drama film, produced by the National Film Board of Canada and directed by Giles Walker.

The film stars Les Rubie as Tommy, an aging World War II veteran, and Matt Craven as Lennie, a young street thug, who end up having a profound impact on each other's lives after Lennie's attempt to rob Tommy ends up with both of them in hospital recovering from their injuries.

Production
The film had a budget of $252,527.

Reception
Clifford Chadderton criticized the film in an open letter on 8 May 1980, due to the hero being an alcoholic.

Awards
The film was an Academy Award nominee for Best Live Action Short Film at the 52nd Academy Awards, and won the Genie Award for Best TV Drama Under 30 Minutes at the 1st Genie Awards. Savas Kalogeras won the Genie for Cinematography in a Dramatic Film (Non-Feature).

References

Works cited

External links

Watch Bravery in the Field at the National Film Board of Canada

1979 films
Films directed by Giles Walker
Films set in New Brunswick
Films shot in New Brunswick
National Film Board of Canada short films
1970s English-language films
Canadian drama short films
1970s Canadian films